David Matthew Richards (born 31 December 1993) is a Welsh professional footballer who plays as a goalkeeper for League Two club Crewe Alexandra.

Early life
Richards was born in Abergavenny in Wales.
Richards is a self professed Leeds United fan as he grew up following the club due to the fact that he has family in the Leeds area.

Club career

Cardiff City
Richards started his career with Cardiff City spending time out on loan to Llanelli in 2012 and with Chippenham Town in 2013. In October 2013, Richards joined Bristol City on a loan deal which was made permanent in January 2014.

Bristol City
Richards spent the majority of his career at City on the bench. During this time Bristol City won League One and Richards received a winners medal as an unused substitute as City beat Walsall to win the  Football League Trophy.

Crewe Alexandra
In July 2015, after his release from Bristol City, Richards signed for Crewe Alexandra. Richard spent two years acting as understudy for Ben Garratt before making his senior debut in English football in September 2017 as Crewe lost 1–0 at Coventry City.

In April 2017, Richards signed an extended Crewe Alexandra contract until at least 2019, with a year option. That year option was automatically exercised by Crewe at the end of the 2018–19 season. On 13 August 2019, Richards saved a vital penalty at Middlesbrough as Crewe beat the Championship side 4–2 on penalties after a 2–2 draw, earning the Cheshire side an EFL Cup second round home tie against Premier League side Aston Villa. He also saved a penalty in his first league start of the season, at Grimsby Town on 7 September 2019, helping Crewe to a 2–0 win.

Richards was offered a new contract in June 2020, and agreed a two-year deal. He signed a new deal in May 2022, but missed Crewe's opening games of the following season due to a finger injury and resulting operation, being replaced by Arsenal loanee keeper Arthur Okonkwo as Crewe won their first two games. Okonkwo made 26 appearances and kept ten clean sheets for Crewe before he was recalled by Arsenal in mid-January, with Richards making his first league appearance of the season in a 1–1 draw at Mansfield Town on 14 January 2023.

Career statistics

Honours
Bristol City
 Football League Trophy (1): 2015

References

External links
Dave Richards profile on the Crewe Alexandra F.C. website

1993 births
Living people
Welsh footballers
Association football goalkeepers
Cardiff City F.C. players
Bristol City F.C. players
Crewe Alexandra F.C. players
English Football League players